Multiple designation systems have been used to specify United States military aircraft. The first was designed in 1919 when the US Army's Aeronautical Division became the United States Army Air Service. Before this, aircraft were put into service under their manufacturers' designations.

History

United States Army Air Service system 1919–1924 

During this period Type Designations used by the United States Army Air Service were allotted, using two or three letters, which were an abbreviation of the aircraft's purpose.  Examples include GA for Ground Attack aircraft, NO for Night Observation aircraft, and NBS for Night Bombardment, Short Distance aircraft.

Army aviation system 1924–1962 

From 1924 to 1947 the Air Service, United States Army Air Corps, United States Army Air Forces and United States Air Force used a designation system based on mission category, with each model in a category numbered sequentially. In 1947, the designation system was extensively overhauled, with several categories being dispensed with, and others renamed. For instance, the Lockheed P-80 Shooting Star (Pursuit) was redesignated as F-80 (Fighter), while the A-26 medium bomber/attack aircraft was redesignated as the B-26, reusing the designation, the Martin B-26 having retired in the meantime.

US Navy system pre-1962 

The United States Navy (including United States Marine Corps and United States Coast Guard) had several systems for designating aircraft beginning with the 1911 system which was followed shortly by the 1914 system. The 1922 system used a completely separate designation system, based on both mission and manufacturer and lasted until 1962.

United States Army system 1956–1962 

From 1956 to 1962 the United States Army used a separate designation system from that of the United States Air Force.

Tri-service aircraft system (Air Force/Army/Navy) 1962–present 

Starting 18 September 1962, a joint system of mission-based designations was used, with most of these restarting from 1. Various previously-designated models from the pre-1962 Army-Air Force system (such as the F-111) were not redesignated. 

All in-use USN/USMC aircraft from the pre-1962 system were redesignated within the new system. An attempt was made to retain the original Type Sequence numbers for as many aircraft as possible. Thus, the F2H Banshee became the F-2, the F4H Phantom II became the F-4 and the F8U Crusader became the F-8.

The 1962 Tri-Service aircraft designation system is still in use today, though, since 1974, it has been presented and maintained alongside the 1963 Tri-Service rocket and guided missile designation system. DoD Directive 4120.15, first issued in 1971 and most recently updated in 2020 (4120.15E incorporating Change 02 "Designating and Naming Military Aerospace Vehicles") is implemented via Air Force Instruction 16-401/Army Regulation 70-50/Naval Air Systems Command Instruction (NAVAIRINST) 13100.16 (3 November 2020) and describes both systems. A list of US military aircraft was kept via 4120.15-L Model Designation of Military Aerospace Vehicles 31 August 2018 until its transition to data.af.mil on 31 August 2018.

See also
 List of military aircraft of the United States
 List of undesignated military aircraft of the United States
 List of U.S. DoD aircraft designations
 Military aircraft
 United States military aircraft engine designations

References

Citations

Bibliography

External links
 A comprehensive explanation can be found at Systems of Designation.

American military aviation
United States military-related lists
United States